Sir Robert Lachlan Macalister (2 December 1890 – 23 May 1967) was the Mayor of Wellington from 1950 to 1956, and had been the acting mayor for five months in 1948 during the absence overseas of Will Appleton.

Biography

Early life and career
Macalister was born in Blenheim and moved to Wellington in his youth to study at Victoria University where he qualified as a Lawyer. He then enlisted in the military and served during World War I and once returning he became a member of the War Relief Association. He was a barrister and solicitor by trade and worked at the same legal firm as Ossie Mazengarb and Ernst Peterson Hay. The firm of Mazengarb, Hay and Macalister was founded in 1918 and quickly became one of the largest law practices in Wellington. In 1919 he married Katherine Featherston Fitzgerald.

Political career
In 1933 he stood for council on a Citizens' Association ticket and was narrowly elected on the first count. However, after special votes were counted he lost his seat to the Labour Party's Peter Butler. He was elected a member of the Wellington City Council in 1938 and served until 1950 when he was elected Mayor. Macalister served as Mayor until 1956. He was also a member of the Wellington Harbour Board from 1942 to 1956. As mayor he was noted for providing the city with modernised recreational facilities.

The 1956 mayoral election was conducted amidst a selection controversy by the Citizens' Association. Under the impression that incumbent Macalister was not intending to seek a third term as Mayor, Ernest Toop applied to gain nomination as the official Citizens' candidacy. As Toop was the only applicant he was successful. However, Macalister had intended to run for mayor again and assumed he, as incumbent, would gain automatic nomination. Undeterred, Macalister ran for mayor again as an Independent which split the Citizens' vote enabling Labour's Frank Kitts to win the mayoralty.

Later life and death
After a period of illness he died at his home in Wadestown on 23 May 1967, aged 76.

Honours
In the 1956 Queen's Birthday Honours, Macalister was appointed a Knight Bachelor, in recognition of his service as mayor of Wellington. Macalister Park in Wellington and Macalister Cove in Tahuahua/Blackwood Bay are named after him. The cove is where Macalister had a holiday home.

Notes

References

|-

1890 births
1967 deaths
20th-century New Zealand politicians
Deputy mayors of Wellington
Mayors of Wellington
20th-century New Zealand lawyers
Wellington City Councillors
Wellington Harbour Board members
New Zealand Knights Bachelor
New Zealand politicians awarded knighthoods
New Zealand military personnel of World War I